The Florida State Seminoles women's golf team represents Florida State University (variously Florida State or FSU) in the sport of golf. The Seminoles compete in Division I of the National Collegiate Athletic Association (NCAA) and the Atlantic Coast Conference (ACC). They play their home matches on the Don A. Veller Seminole Golf Course on the university's Tallahassee, Florida campus, and are currently led by head coach Amy Bond.

History
In the 50-year history of the Seminoles' women's golf program, they have won three conference championships and one national championship.

Alumni who have gone on to represent Florida State University with wins on the LPGA Tour include Karen Stupples, Jane Geddes, Colleen Walker, Lisa Walters, and Kris Tamulis.

Don A. Veller Seminole Golf Course

The Dave Middleton Golf Complex and the Don Veller Seminole Golf Course are home to the PGA Golf Management Program, which is one of only a few programs in the country accredited by the Professional Golfers' Association of America. The $7 million facility is a two-building complex, which also includes a multi-directional driving range, a video analysis instructional center with hitting bays for inclement weather, chipping and putting greens, as well as locker rooms, a team lounge, auditorium and fitness facility.

The golf course was renovated in 2004 with the reconstruction of all 18 greens, complexes, tee boxes and TiffEagle Turf was installed on all the putting surfaces. Each year the facility hosts more than 60,000 rounds of golf. The golf course was recently recognized as one of the top 10 golf courses in the country by the National Golf Foundation for customer loyalty and satisfaction. In 2007 a new 21,000-square-foot (2,000 m2) chipping green was added in the southeast corner near the 29 driving range boxes. A 10-acre (40,000 m2) practice facility is used by the FSU golf team and students in the PGM program.

In 2017, the University announced that Nicklaus Design had been hired to renovate the course at a cost of $4–6 million. The renovation created one of the top university courses in the country, Seminole Legacy Golf Club.

See also

Florida State Seminoles
Florida State Seminoles men's golf

References

External links
Seminoles.com – Official website of the Florida State Seminoles women's golf team.

 
Women's golf in the United States